Celbridge Collegiate School  is a former Protestant girls school situated outside Celbridge in County Kildare in Ireland located 22 kilometres (13 miles) from Dublin.  It was known as a nursery of teachers for the Church of Ireland training college and for the proficiency of the Irish language among students.

Foundation
The vision for the school was set out in the will of William Conolly: 
"to be laid out by them a convenient building in or near to the town of Celbridge in the county of Kildare on such spot of ground as shall be set out for them for that purpose by my said dear wife and nephew for the reception of forty orphans or other poor children.” 
It was built in 1733–7  by, Katherine Conolly (c.1662–1752), who gave £50 a year for its maintenance during her life.

Architecture
The building is of Georgian architecture and its most characteristic feature is the triple gates. It was designed by architect Thomas Burgh  who also built the Royal Barracks and famous library building at Trinity College  both in Dublin on fifty acres of land to accommodate forty female who were to be "lodged, clothed and dieted" there. 
The aim of this charity school was to rescue children of the "poor natives from ignorance and superstition" and instruct them in "the English tongue, in manners and in the Protestant faith." Students were employed on the farm and they carried on linen and hempen manufacture through all stages from seed, to loom, to bleaching.
In 1837 one hundred students attended, thirty of whom were nominated by Edward Conolly.  At the time of Lady Louisa's death it had 600 pupils, It served as a boarding school for Protestant girls until 1973. when the Incorporated Society for Promoting Protestant Schools in Ireland closed the school and transferred the pupils to Kilkenny. The building reopened as the Setanta Hotel on January 25, 1980.

Principals

1783 Mary Taylor
1789 Katharine Holt
1811 Bridget Boyle
 John Boyle husband of Bridget
1850 Mary McKenny Died
1851 Anne Boyle
1859 Sarah Crawford
1864 Anne Crawford (Interim)
1864 Eliza Crawford (Interim)
1867 Anne E Crawford
1894 Bessie St George (Matron)
1895 Augusta L’Estrange
1898 Annie McCullough
1909 Georgina E Osborne
(Died before taking up office
1909 Emma McClelland
1920 Dora Cos (Interim)
1920 Emma McClelland
1942 Anna Hadassah "Nancy" O’Connor
1967 Mary Taylor
1970 Freda D Yates
1973 School closed

References

Girls' schools in the Republic of Ireland
Educational institutions established in 1737
Educational institutions disestablished in 1973
Defunct schools in the Republic of Ireland
Secondary schools in County Kildare
Celbridge
1973 disestablishments in Ireland
1737 establishments in the British Empire